The North Up Alliance ("N.U.A.")  is a Dutch football tifosi group associated with AFC Ajax. The name is from their location the stand in Ajax' home stadium Amsterdam Arena, namely rows 409 to 414 in the 2nd ring of the Stadium.

Background 
North Up Alliance was founded in June 2012 as a collective atmosphere group of the upper North ring of the Stadium. With approximately 300 members occupying rows 409 to 414 of the second ring, the various supporters groups united to create much larger banners, and to help bring more atmosphere near the section for the away supporters. Due to their close proximity to the away supporters section, the group are more restricted then others in the Stadium. The group have reached an acceptable agreement with the club and were granted permission to occupy the Northern ring, as long as they stay within their boundaries and adhere to the guidelines which were agreed upon. Every Thursday night the group actively meet at the Amsterdam ArenA to prepare their massive banners for the weekend. The group distance themselves from the hooligan nature of other groups, such as the F-side and VAK410, but are known in Dutch media for their Tifosi activity, and for the manner in which they deliver messages revolving around Ajax current events. North Up Alliance and the South Crew are also the two groups at Ajax responsible for the graffiti pieces that are found inside the tunnels of the Amsterdam Arena, from the players entrance to the locker rooms.

Judaism 
Ajax is popularly seen as having "Jewish roots" and in the 1970s supporters of rival teams began taunting Ajax fans by calling them Jews. Ajax fans (few of whom are actually Jewish) responded by embracing Ajax's "Jewish" identity: calling themselves "super Jews", chanting "Joden, Joden"" (Jews, Jews) at games, and adopting Jewish symbols such as the Star of David and the Israeli flag. This Jewish imagery eventually became a central part of Ajax fans' culture. At one point ringtones of "Hava Nagila", a Hebrew folk song, could be downloaded from the club's official website. Beginning in the 1980s, fans of Ajax's rivals escalated their antisemitic rhetoric, chanting slogans like "Hamas, Hamas/Jews to the gas" ("Hamas, hamas, joden aan het gas"), hissing to imitate the flow of gas, giving Nazi salutes, etc. The eventual result was that many (genuinely) Jewish Ajax fans stopped going to games. In the 2000s the club began trying to persuade fans to drop their Jewish image, yet have achieved no success in this pursuit. Supporters, on and off the field, still employ imagery associated with Jewish history and the Israeli nation. Tottenham Hotspur's Yid Army use similar symbols.

See also 
F-side
South Crew
VAK410
Tifosi
Ultras

References

External links
North Up Official website
North Up Alliance Official website

AFC Ajax
Association football supporters
2012 establishments in the Netherlands